Peasiella patula is a species of sea snail, a marine gastropod mollusk in the family Littorinidae, the winkles or periwinkles.

Description

Distribution

References

 Reid D.G. & Mak Y.-M. (1998). Additions and corrections to the Taxonomy of the genus Peasiella Nevill, 1885 (Gastropoda: Littorinidae). The Nautilus 112(1):6–33.

Littorinidae
Gastropods described in 1998